Green Hill (also Matanginui or Greenmount) is one of the volcanoes in the Auckland volcanic field, located in the suburb of Greenmount. It erupted approximately 20,000 years ago, and its scoria cone had a peak 78 metres above sea level (around 48 m higher than the surrounding land) and had a grove of karaka trees. The hill was the site of a Ngāi Tai iwi pā.

It was quarried from 1870 onwards, and has been mostly quarried away. The site is now Greenmount landfill. Green Hill and nearby Otara Hill were together referred to as Bessy Bell and Mary Gray after an old Scottish ballad.

References

City of Volcanoes: A geology of Auckland - Searle, Ernest J.; revised by Mayhill, R.D.; Longman Paul, 1981. First published 1964. .
Volcanoes of Auckland: A Field Guide. Hayward, B.W.; Auckland University Press, 2019, 335 pp. .

External links
View south-east from Mt Wellington in 1920. Green Hill is visible in the distance to the left of Otara Hill.
Aerial photo of Green Hill around 1950-60.

Auckland volcanic field